During the 1930s and World War II, German authorities engaged in persecution of Poles in Warmia.

The activities of Polish organisations in Warmia were observed and reported by police. So-called "Vertrauensmänner", unpaid informants of the German police, supplied information on the most active members, as well as helped in preparing lists of people that would be selected to be executed or sent to Nazi concentration camps.

Having information on who sent children to Polish schools, took part in masses for Poles, bought Polish newspapers, or organisations, the nationalist German militia engaged in attacks on Poles. Polish schools, printing houses, masses, and headquarters were attacked. Homes of local Polish activists were subject to attacks as well. Polish teachers were harassed, as German nationalists gathered at their homes and shouted "Wenn das Polenblut vom Messer spritzt, dann geht’s noch mal so gut" ("When Polish blood spurts from the knife, everything will be better").

Discrimination increased in 1939 as active Poles were ordered to leave their homes. Catholic newspapers were closed as well local cultural centers involved with Poles. At the start of summer, masses in Polish were forbidden by the German authorities. Before the German invasion of Poland in the last days of August, police eradicated all elements of social and political life of the Polish minority in Germany. This was done by interning almost all activists of Polish organisations, teachers, people who worked in Polish banks, community workers, and priests. Prominent Polish cultural activists were murdered, such as Seweryn Pieniężny, Leon Włodarczak, Juliusz Malewski, and Stefan Różycki.  Locals who showed interest in Polish culture were sometimes forced to erase signs, posters, or Polish symbols from places that formerly housed Polish organisations,   after which they were murdered.

References

Nazi war crimes in Poland
1930s in Poland
Poland in World War II
Germany–Poland relations